Faillon Lake is a freshwater body of the townships of Faillon (northeastern part) and Boisseau (southwestern part), in the territory of Senneterre, in La Vallée-de-l'Or Regional County Municipality (RCM), in the administrative region of Abitibi-Témiscamingue, in the province of Quebec, in Canada.

Lake Faillon is crossed to the Southwest by the current of the Mégiscane River.

Forestry is the main economic activity of the sector; recreational tourism activities come second. Its surface is generally frozen from the beginning of December to the end of April.

The hydrographic slope of Lake Faillon is mainly served by a forest road that goes north-east on the north bank of the Mégiscane River. The southwestern part of the lake is served by another branch of the forest road that runs east.

Geography

Toponymy
In the past, this lake was called "Millie Lake". The Geography Commission of Quebec gave it its new name in 1921 in honor of the Sulpician Étienne-Michel Faillon (1799-1870), author, in 1865, of a publication entitled History of French colonization in Canada.

The name "Lac Faillon" was officialized on December 5, 1968 by the Commission de toponymie du Québec when it was created.

Notes and references

See also 

La Vallée-de-l’Or
Lakes of Abitibi-Témiscamingue
Nottaway River drainage basin